The 2013–14 Polish Basketball League – for sponsorship reasons the Tauron Basket Liga – was the 80th season of the highest professional basketball league in Poland and the 18th since the foundation of the Polish Basketball League. PGE Turów Zgorzelec won the Polish national title for the first time in franchise history.

Teams

Standings

First round

Second round

Playoffs

Awards

Polish clubs in European competitions

Polish clubs in Regional competitions

References

External links
Polska Liga Koszykówki - Official Site 
Polish League at Eurobasket.com

Polish Basketball League seasons
Polish
Lea